Chris Butler may refer to:

 Chris Butler (actor), portrayed the Cousin in Torchwood and Matan Brody in The Good Wife
 Chris Butler (cyclist) (born 1988), American cyclist, in the 2011 BMC Racing Team season
 Chris Butler (diplomat), New Zealand ambassador to South Korea and the Netherlands
 Chris Butler (filmmaker) (born 1974), an English storyboard artist, writer and director
 Chris Butler (ice hockey) (born 1986), American ice hockey player
 Chris Butler (musician) (born 1949), American musician with The Waitresses
 Chris Butler (politician) (born 1950), British Conservative Party politician
 Chris Butler (private investigator), American private investigator and former police officer
 Chris A. Butler (1952–1994), American set decorator
 Chris Butler, aka Jagad Guru Siddhaswarupananda Paramahamsa, founder of Science of Identity Foundation

See also
 Christopher Butler (disambiguation)